Hanna-Barbera's 50th: A Yabba Dabba Doo Celebration (also known as A Yabba Dabba Doo Celebration: 50 Years of Hanna-Barbera) is a 1989 American live-action/animated television special which premiered on TNT on July 17, 1989.

Summary 
The special is hosted by that night's guest stars Tony Danza and Annie Potts celebrating 50 years of William Hanna and Joseph Barbera's partnership in animation. This is the first animated project to be broadcast in Dolby Surround sound system.

It covers their years working for the Metro-Goldwyn-Mayer cartoon studio and then the history of Hanna-Barbera, which was set up in 1957. It features footage and clips from the studio's various cartoons along with new animated/live-action wraparounds and a behind-the-scenes segment on the then-upcoming Jetsons: The Movie.

The special was dedicated to the loving memory of Daws Butler, who died during its production, and it was also the last television and film project of both Mel Blanc and George O'Hanlon, who died before the special's telecast. Turner Broadcasting System, which owned TNT, would later purchase Hanna-Barbera in 1991.

Cartoon characters 
Among the cartoon characters that appear in this special are the following:

 Astro
 Atom Ant
 Augie Doggie and Doggie Daddy
 Baba Looey
 Bamm-Bamm Rubble
 Barney Rubble
 Betty Rubble
 Boo-Boo Bear
 Brainy Smurf
 Breezly Bruin
 Choo-Choo
 Cindy Bear
 Daphne Blake
 Dick Dastardly
 Ding-A-Ling Wolf
 Dino
 Droopy
 Dum Dum
 Elroy Jetson
 Fancy-Fancy
 Fluid-Man
 Fred Flintstone
 Fred Jones
 Gargamel
 George Jetson
 Hokey Wolf
 Hong Kong Phooey
 Huckleberry Hound
 Jane Jetson
 Jerry Mouse
 Jonny Quest
 Judy Jetson
 Magilla Gorilla
 Mildew Wolf
 Muttley
 Papa Smurf
 Pebbles Flintstone
 Penelope Pitstop
 Peter Potamus
 Pixie and Dixie
 Punkin' Puss
 Quick Draw McGraw
 Rosie the Robot Maid
 Ruff and Reddy
 Scooby-Doo
 Scooby-Dum
 Scrappy-Doo
 Secret Squirrel
 Shaggy Rogers
 Smurfette
 Snagglepuss
 Sneezly Seal
 Snooper and Blabber
 Snuffles
 Squiddly Diddly
 Tom Cat
 Top Cat
 Touché Turtle
 Velma Dinkley
 Wally Gator
 Wilma Flintstone
 Winsome Witch
 Yogi Bear

Celebrities 
 Tony Danza (host)
 Annie Potts (co-host)
 Betty White
 Joe Ferguson
 Jonathan Winters
 Phyllis Diller
 Sammy Davis, Jr.
 Shari Belafonte
 Tiffany
 Tommy Lasorda
 Valerie Harper
 Victor Borge
 Whoopi Goldberg

Voices 
 Greg Burson as Yogi Bear, Huckleberry Hound, Snagglepuss, Quick Draw McGraw, and Snuffles
 Danny Goldman as Brainy Smurf
 Casey Kasem as Shaggy Rogers
 Don Messick as Scooby-Doo, Boo-Boo Bear, Ranger Smith, Astro, Muttley, Droopy, and Papa Smurf
 Greg Berg as Baba Looey and Augie Doggie
 Henry Corden as Fred Flintstone
 Jean Vander Pyl as Wilma Flintstone
 Janet Waldo - Judy Jetson, Josie McCoy, and Penelope Pitstop
 George O'Hanlon as George Jetson
 John Stephenson as Doggie Daddy, Mr. Slate, and Snooper
 Mel Blanc as Barney Rubble and Dino 
 Lucille Bliss as Smurfette
 Penny Singleton as Jane Jetson

References

External links 
 
 

1989 television specials
1989 in American television
1980s American television specials
1980s animated television specials
Hanna-Barbera television specials
TNT (American TV network) original programming
Hanna-Barbera
The Flintstones television specials
Yogi Bear television specials
Huckleberry Hound specials
Scooby-Doo specials
The Jetsons
Tom and Jerry
The Smurfs
Top Cat
Wacky Races
Golden jubilees
Animated crossover television specials
Films directed by Marshall Flaum